The Dark Husband is a Big Finish Productions audio drama based on the long-running British science fiction television series Doctor Who.

Plot
At the Festival of the Twin Moons of Tuin, a unique wedding is about to take place.

Cast
Seventh Doctor – Sylvester McCoy
Ace – Sophie Aldred
Hex – Philip Olivier
Ori – Danny Webb
Irit – Andy B Newb
Tuin – Benny Dawb
The Bards – Katarina Olsson & Sean Connolly

External links
Big Finish Productions – The Dark Husband

2008 audio plays
Seventh Doctor audio plays